The Mozambican Roller Hockey Championship (Campeonato Moçambicano de Hóquei em Patins, Portuguese name) or Moçóquei is the top division of Mozambican Roller Hockey, and it is organized by the Mozambican Roller Sports Federation.

Participating clubs in 2010 
The clubs that competed in the season of 2010 were:
 Clube Ferroviário de Maputo
 Grupo Desportivo de Maputo
 Grupo Desportivo Estrela Vermelha de Maputo
 Clube de Desportos do Maxaquene

List of Winners
 2010: Grupo Desportivo de Maputo
 2009: Clube Ferroviário de Maputo
 2008: Clube Ferroviário de Maputo
 2007: --- no championship --
 2006: Grupo Desportivo de Maputo
 2005: Clube Ferroviário de Maputo
 2004: Grupo Desportivo de Maputo
 2003: Grupo Desportivo de Maputo
 2002: Grupo Desportivo de Maputo
 2001: Grupo Desportivo de Maputo
 2000: Grupo Desportivo de Maputo
 1999: Grupo Desportivo de Maputo
 1998: Grupo Desportivo de Maputo
 1997: Grupo Desportivo de Maputo
 1996: Grupo Desportivo de Maputo
 1995: Grupo Desportivo de Maputo
 1994: Grupo Desportivo de Maputo
 1993: Grupo Desportivo Estrela Vermelha de Maputo
 1992: Grupo Desportivo Estrela Vermelha de Maputo
 1991: Grupo Desportivo Estrela Vermelha de Maputo
 1990: Grupo Desportivo Estrela Vermelha de Maputo
 1989: Mabor de Moçambique
 1988: Clube Ferroviário de Maputo
 1987: Grupo Desportivo de Maputo
 1986: Clube Ferroviário de Maputo
 1985: Clube Ferroviário de Maputo
 1984: Clube de Desportos da Costa do Sol
 1983: Clube de Desportos da Costa do Sol
 1982: Clube de Desportos da Costa do Sol
 1981: Clube de Desportos da Costa do Sol
 1980: Clube de Desportos da Costa do Sol
 1979: Clube de Desportos da Costa do Sol
 1978: Benfica de Lourenço Marques
 1977: Clube Ferroviário de Lourenço Marques
 1976: Grupo Desportivo de Lourenço Marques
 1963: Clube Ferroviário de Lourenço Marques
 1962: Clube Ferroviário de Lourenço Marques
 1961: Clube Ferroviário de Lourenço Marques
 1960: CD Malhangalene
 1959: CD Malhangalene
 1958: CD Malhangalene
 1957: Clube Ferroviário de Lourenço Marques
 1956: Clube Ferroviário de Lourenço Marques
 1955: Clube Ferroviário de Lourenço Marques

Number of Championships by team

The total number of championships takes into account the changing of some club names after independence :
 
Clube Ferroviário de Maputo from Clube Ferroviário de Lourenço Marques
Grupo Desportivo Estrela Vermelha de Maputo from Malhangalene
Clube de Desportos da Costa do Sol from Benfica de Lourenço Marques
Grupo Desportivo de Maputo from Grupo Desportivo de Lourenço Marques

External links

Mozambique websites
Roller Sports Mozambican Federation

International
 Roller Hockey links worldwide
 Mundook-World Roller Hockey
Hardballhock-World Roller Hockey
Inforoller World Roller Hockey
 World Roller Hockey Blog
rink-hockey-news - World Roller Hockey
HoqueiPatins.cat - World Roller Hockey

M
Roller hockey in Mozambique
Mozambique